Chaetosphaeridium is a genus of green algae. Several classifications have been proposed. Its traditional classification is in the order Coleochaetales, related to the genus Coleochaete. AlgaeBase places it in the order Chaetosphaeridiales.

Species 
Species include:
 C. globosum 
 C. huberi
 C. minus
 C. ovalis 
 C. pringsheimii 

GBIF only accepts Chaetosphaeridium globosum, Chaetosphaeridium ovalis and Chaetosphaeridium pringsheimii.

References 

Charophyta
Charophyta genera